The Scottish Rally Championship is a rallying series run throughout Scotland over the course of a year, that comprises both gravel and tarmac surface rallies. The 2020 series began on the forest tracks around Inverness on 7 March, with the season finale due to take place around Dalbeattie on 19 September.

Series Cancellation

On 24 March 2020, due to the ongoing COVID-19 pandemic Organisers of the KNC Groundworks Scottish Rally Championship took the decision to cancel the 2020 championship. The coronavirus pandemic continued to spread leading to a number of events being cancelled. With round 1, the Snowman Rally,  being the only event to take place thus far it was decided that the results of that event would stand but the championship points would be null and void.

2020 calendar
For season 2020 there were. scheduled to be seven events held predominantly on gravel surfaces. In January 2020 the organising team of the Argyll Rally scheduled to take place in June, announced that the 2020 event would not take place. The change from a forest rally to a closed road event meant that the event organisers were unable to secure the relevant authorisations within the timeframe available.
Due to the COVID-19 pandemic the organisers of the Speyside Stages Rally, the Jim Clark rally, the Scottish Rally, the Grampian Stages Rally and the Galloway Hills rally announced that the events would be cancelled.

2020 events podium

References

External links
 
 RSAC Scottish Rally Homepage

Scottish Rally Championship seasons
Scottish Rally Championship
Scottish Rally Championship
Scottish Rally Championship
Scottish